Lieutenant-General Sir Henry King KCB (1776–1839) was a British Army officer and Member of Parliament for County Sligo in Ireland.

He was the fourth son of Robert King, 2nd Earl of Kingston (1754–1799).

He joined the army as an ensign in the 47th Foot in 1794. He was subsequently a lieutenant (1795), a captain in the 56th Foot (1796), the Life Guards (1799) and the 43rd Foot (1802), a major in the 5th Foot (1804), a lieut.-colonel in 1809, a colonel in 1814 and a major-general in 1825.
He was then colonel of the 1st West India Regiment (1834) and a lieut.-general in 1838. He was severely wounded in both legs in 1799 and captured in 1805. Following the disbandment of his battalion in 1816 he was appointed to the office of Groom of the Bedchamber to the Prince Regent, afterwards George IV of the United Kingdom, serving from 1817 to 1830. He was knighted KCB on 28 March 1835.

He lived at Grove Lodge at Winkfield Row, near Windsor in Berkshire.

He died in 1839 and was buried in the parish church at Winkfield. He had married twice: firstly Mary, the daughter of the Hon. and Very Rev. John Hewitt, dean of Cloyne, with whom he had three sons and four daughters and secondly Catherine, the daughter of Rev. Edward Philipps, and widow of J. Richardson.

References

External links 
 

1776 births
1839 deaths
People from Winkfield
British Army lieutenant generals
Knights Commander of the Order of the Bath
Members of the Parliament of the United Kingdom for County Sligo constituencies (1801–1922)
West India Regiment officers
Younger sons of earls
UK MPs 1820–1826
UK MPs 1826–1830
UK MPs 1830–1831